Science Fiction in Old San Francisco: Volume One, History of the Movement From 1854 to 1890 is a history of science fiction writers in San Francisco in the period following the American Civil War by Sam Moskowitz.  It was first published by Donald M. Grant, Publisher, Inc. in 1980 in an edition of 1,500 copies.  This book with its companion volume Into the Sun & Other Stories won a Pilgrim Award for the author in 1981.

Notes

References
 
 

1980 non-fiction books
20th-century history books
American history books
American science fiction
Books about books
Books about the San Francisco Bay Area
History of San Francisco
Science fiction studies
Donald M. Grant, Publisher books